Snakes and Ladders is a 1965 Spanish comedy film directed by Manuel Summers. It was entered into the 1965 Cannes Film Festival.

Cast
 Sonia Bruno - Ángela
 María Massip - Blanca
 José Antonio Amor - Pablo
 Julieta Serrano
 Pedro Sopeña
 Paco Valladares
 Juan Luis Galiardo - (as L. Galiardo)
 Ángel Luis Álvarez
 Carolina Fraile
 Pascual Martín
 María Burgos
 Ulla Foltin
 Cristina V. López
 Cecilia Villarreal
 Pilar Guijarro
 Guadalupe Olmedo
 Ángel Córdoba
 Luis Barbero - Recepcionista Hotel
 Eduardo Mateo

References

External links

1965 films
1960s Spanish-language films
1965 comedy films
Spanish black-and-white films
Films directed by Manuel Summers
1960s Spanish films